is a law firm in Tokyo, Japan, founded in 1994 as Atsumi & Usui by a group of lawyers led by Hiroo Atsumi, who came from Blakemore & Mitsuki law firm. From 2003, the firm was known as Atsumi & Partners. And since the joining of a practice group from TMI Associates, the firm has changed its name to Atsumi & Sakai.

Atsumi & Sakai was the first Japanese law firm to take advantage of the opportunity to form a joint venture with foreign lawyers (gaikokuhō kyōdō jigyō). With the opening of an office in London (Atsumi & Sakai Europe Limited ("A&S Europe")) in January 2015, Atsumi & Sakai became the first Japanese law firm with an office in the EMEA-Region. In 2015, an office in Germany (Atsumi & Sakai Europa GmbH - Rechtsanwälte und Steuerberater (“A&S Frankfurt”)) was opened in Frankfurt am Main, led by licensed German lawyers and a Japanese tax consultant qualified for consulting German tax law. Atsumi & Sakai was then awarded "Overseas Practice Law Firm of the Year" by Asian Legal Business (ALB) three times in a row in 2018, 2019 and 2020. Besides, Atsumi & Sakai also has a tie-up with A-PAC INTERNATIONAL LAW FIRM in Vietnam (Hanoi and Ho Chi Minh city). Atsumi & Sakai New York LLP ("A&S New York") was opened in February 2020 and In September 2022, Fukuoka Affiliate Office (A&S Fukuoka LPC) was opened.

The Legal 500 ranks Atsumi & Sakai as a top-tier firm in banking/finance, Fintech, investment funds, and as a second-tier firm in antitrust/competition, corporate/M&A, intellectual property, projects/energy, real estate/construction, risk management/investigations, shipping, TMT. IFLR ranks the firm as first-tier in capital markets: structured finance and securitisation and as second-tier in banking, project development and project finance. Chambers & Partners ranks the firm's founding partner Hiroo Atsumi as a "Senior Statespeople" in banking, finance and capital markets.

Practices 
With a large number of qualified Japanese and foreign lawyers, Atsumi & Sakai can advise on New York and California state law, U.S. federal law, German law, Queensland state law, Australian federal law, English and Wales law, and Indian law.

The firm is a so-called full-service law firm and covers all major areas of law with its advice. The lawyers of Atsumi & Sakai has abundant practical experience and know-how in a wide range of fields including finance, M&A / investment projects, antitrust law, various funds, labor law, intellectual property, IT/TMT, international trade, litigation / arbitration / bankruptcy / business revitalization, life sciences, energy, sports / entertainment, and innovation fields such as crisis management and Fintech/IoT/AI.

History 

 1994 - Established as “Atsumi & Usui”
 2003 - Changed the name to “Atsumi & Partners”
 April 2005 - Formed a foreign law joint venture; name changed to Atsumi & Sakai
 July 2013 - Entered into a Foreign Law Joint Enterprise with Janssen Foreign Law Office; Janssen Foreign Law Office changed its name to “Janssen Foreign Law Joint Enterprise with Atsumi & Sakai”.
 August 2014 - Opened Berlin Affiliate Office
 January 2015 - Opened London Office as Atsumi & Sakai Europe Limited
 December 2015 - Berlin Affiliate Office relocated to Frankfurt (Atsumi & Sakai Europa GmbH - Rechtsanwälte und Steuerberater)。
 December 2020 - Opened Kojimachi Office of Atsumi & Sakai Legal Professional Corporation (Secondary office of Atsumi & Sakai Legal Professional Corporation)
 February 2021 - Opened Atsumi & Sakai New York LLP
 September 2022 - Opened Fukuoka Affiliate Office (A&S Fukuoka LPC)
 January 2023 - Kojimachi Office became independent under the name Atsumi Law Office (becoming an affiliate office of Atsumi & Sakai Legal Professional Corporation)

References

External links 
 

Law firms of Japan
Law firms established in 1994